The Lamar County School District (LCSD) is a public school district based in Purvis, Mississippi (USA).

In addition to Purvis, the district also serves the town of Sumrall; the communities of Arnold Line, Baxterville, Lumberton, Oak Grove, and West Hattiesburg; and portions of Hattiesburg, as well as most rural areas in Lamar County. The district extends into Pearl River County, where it serves the rest of Lumberton.

History
The Lumberton Public School District was disestablished, as per Governor of Mississippi Phil Bryant signing Senate Bill 2500, which required consolidation, in 2016.

Initially the Lumberton district, as per the senate bill, was to be dissolved effective July 1, 2019, with portions in Lamar County going to the Lamar County School District and Pearl River County portions to the Poplarville Separate School District. By 2018 the Lumberton and Lamar county districts chose to do a voluntary consolidation, effective July 1, 2018, where the entirety of the students living in the Lumberton district, including those in both counties, would continue going to Lumberton school buildings operated by the Lamar district. Poplarville's school board as well as the Pearl River County Board sued to stop the voluntary merger so the school district could obtain a portion of the Lumberton district, but the lawsuit was dismissed. Pearl River County Supervisor Hudson Holliday states that if the Lamar County district later closes Lumberton High School, several Pearl River County students would be assigned to Purvis High School even though Poplarville High School is geographically closer to them.

Schools
Middle and high schools (grades 6-12)
Sumrall Middle & High School (Grades 6-12)
High schools (grades 9-12)
Lumberton High School
Oak Grove High School 
Purvis High School (Grades 9-12)
K-8 schools
Baxterville School
Middle schools (grades 6-8)
Lumberton Middle School
Oak Grove Middle School 
Purvis Middle School
Elementary schools
Lumberton Elementary School (Grades K-5)
Sumrall Elementary School (Grades K-5) 
Oak Grove Elementary School (Grades K-5)
Bellevue Elementary School (Grades K-5)
Longleaf Elementary School (Grades K-5)
Purvis Upper Elementary School (Grades 3-5)
Purvis Lower Elementary School (Grades K-2)

Demographics

2006-07 school year
There were a total of 7,697 students enrolled in the Lamar County School District during the 2006–2007 school year. The gender makeup of the district was 48% female and 52% male. The racial makeup of the district was 18.57% African American, 77.78% White, 2.18% Hispanic, 1.38% Asian, and 0.09% Native American. 28.7% of the district's students were eligible to receive free lunch.

Previous school years

Accountability statistics

See also
List of school districts in Mississippi

References

External links
 
 

Education in Lamar County, Mississippi
Education in Pearl River County, Mississippi
School districts in Mississippi
Hattiesburg, Mississippi